Diann Roffe (born March 24, 1967), also known as Diann Roffe-Steinrotter,  is a former World Cup alpine ski racer and Olympic gold medalist from the United States.

Early life 
Roffe was born in Warsaw, New York and learned to ski at tiny Brantling Ski Center near Rochester, New York.

Career 
Roffe placed 8th in the World Cup Giant Slalom Race on March 7, 1984, at Lake Placid (and placed 9th in the same discipline on December 15, 1984, at Madonna di Campiglio). She won a gold medal in the GS at the 1985 World Championships in Bormio, Italy at age 17. 

Roffe also won the silver medal (tying with Anita Wachter) in the giant slalom at the 1992 Winter Olympics in Albertville, France. 

Roffe won the Super-G at the 1994 Olympics in Lillehammer, Norway. She took first place in the Super-G at the 1994 World Cup Finals in Vail, Colorado.

She had season-ending knee injuries in 1986 and 1991.

Roffe was Inducted into the National Ski Hall of Fame in 2003.

World Cup results

Season standings

Race podiums
 2 wins – (1 SG, 1 GS)
 8 podiums – (1 SG, 7 GS)

References

External links
 
 Diann Roffe Steinrotter World Cup standings at the International Ski Federation
 
 
 
 
 

1967 births
American female alpine skiers
Alpine skiers at the 1988 Winter Olympics
Alpine skiers at the 1992 Winter Olympics
Alpine skiers at the 1994 Winter Olympics
Living people
Medalists at the 1992 Winter Olympics
Medalists at the 1994 Winter Olympics
Olympic gold medalists for the United States in alpine skiing
Olympic silver medalists for the United States in alpine skiing
People from Warsaw, New York
21st-century American women